Radio Veronica is a Dutch commercial radio station owned by Talpa Radio, a subsidiary of Talpa Network. The station runs pop and rock music from the 1980s, 1990s and 2000s, however in 2017, as the new show schedule was launched, the music format shifted towards so-called timeless hits which also includes recurrents. The station can be compared with Absolute Radio and Radio X (United Kingdom) in the United Kingdom.

Radio Veronica in its present form was created on 31 August 2003 by a merger of the cable station Radio Veronica of the Vereniging Veronica and the golden oldie station Radio 103 of Sky Radio Ltd. In return, received the Vereniging Veronica 3.5% of the shares of the Sky Radio Ltd. in hands. In 2006, this interest was expanded to 10%, after the Telegraaf Media Groep NV and ING acquired the Sky Radio Group and those in Sienna Holding BV - operating under the name Sky Radio Group accommodated. In 2007, the Telegraaf Media Groep NV acquired 85% (now 22.85%) of the company owned and thus control over the company.

The brand "Radio Veronica" has a long heritage in the Netherlands going back to the offshore station (VRON) in the 1960s and early 1970s later becoming (as VOO) part of the Dutch public broadcasting system before once again becoming a private venture however the station/brand has undergone several changes of ownership since.

Radio Veronica is comparable to Sky Radio by their similarity of decades (1980s - today). The only difference is that Sky do not play any "rock" music.

Fluctuations
Uunco Cerfontaine was since 2003 the program director of the station. Early 2013 was Niels Hoogland appointed as program director. On 4 November 2013 the station was a new course. This meant the dismissal of Erwin Peters, Bart van Leeuwen, Luc van Rooij and Dennis Hoebee. The change did not achieve a higher market share. Between January 2013 and October 2014, the market share decreased by 2%. Also Rob van Someren was replaced in autumn 2014 by Jeroen van Inkel. Niels Hoogland was replaced on 1 November 2014 by Erik de Zwart.

Erik de Zwart presented on 2 February 2015 a new programming. In this new course old items, such as "De Stemband", "De plaat en zijn verhaal" and Veronica FM program "Rinkeldekinkel" returned. The design of the station appears again in the eighties, but adapted to the present time. Further De Zwart took the DJs Bart Van Leeuwen and Dennis Hoebee back.

Charts

Current
 Top 1000 allertijden
 Album Top 1000 allertijden
 80s Top 880
 90s Top 590
 00s Top 500
 Top 500 van de 21ste eeuw
 Top 40 Hitdossier
 RockHits Top 500
 Download Top 1000 allertijden

Former
 De Download Top 750
 70s Top 270
 Soulshow Top 100

Spin-off stations 
Radio Veronica and former radio and TV personnel also broadcast a number of spin-off stations which are available only via the Internet:
 Veronica Top 1000 Allertijden
 Veronica Rock Radio
 Veronica Hit Radio
 Veronica Vintage
 Radio Veronica 80's Hits
 Radio Veronica 90's Hits
 Radio Veronica Drive-in Show
 Veronica Comedy Radio
 Wave Radio
 Flower Power Radio
 Baars Classic Rock
 LX Classics
 Radio 192
 ABTT
 Buma Rocks

Logos

See also
 List of radio stations in the Netherlands

References

External links 
  

Radio stations in the Netherlands
Mass media in Naarden